Nikolaus VI Graf Pálffy von Erdőd (1 March 1657 – 20 February 1732) was a Hungarian nobleman, Imperial Field marshal and Palatine of Hungary.

Early life 
He was the eldest son of Count Miklós IV Pálffy von Erdőd (1619–1679) and Maria Eleonora von Harrach zu Rohrau und Thannhausen (1634–1693). János Pálffy was his younger brother.

Career 
Like his father, he pursued a military career and joined the Habsburg Army.
He participated in the Battle of Vienna and the following actions, until he became commander of the Esztergom Fortress in 1687.

In 1688, he participated in the campaign against the Turks under Maximilian II Emanuel, Elector of Bavaria and fought in the Siege of Belgrade (1688), Battle of Batočina, Battle of Niš (1689) and Battle of Slankamen.
  
As a reward, he became Schlosshauptmann von Pressburg (Captain of Pressburg Castle) in 1694, a Knight of the Order of the Golden Fleece in 1711, Palatine of Hungary in 1713 and Field Marshal General in 1718.

As Palatine of Hungary, he organized the supply of the Army defending Hungary against the Turks. It is also to his credit that the Hungarian and Croat nobility accepted the Pragmatic Sanction so quickly.

He died in Pozsony at the age of nearly 75 years.

Marriage and Children 
He married in October 1680 with Baroness Katharina Elisabeth von und zu Weichs (died 1724) and had :
 Lipót I József Ignác Kálmán (1681–1720), Austrian General
 Mária Erzsébet Filippina Borbála, (1681–1732), married Count Karl Cajetan de Longueval of Bocquoy
 Eleonóra Mária Teréz Bonaventura, (1682–1729), married Franz Anton von Abensberg und Traun
 János VI József Antal Prosper (1685–1716), killed in action at the Battle of Petrovaradin
 Ferenc III Rudolf Lõrinc (1686–1735) 
 Károly II József Miklós Rochus (1687–1720) 
 Ferenc IV Henrik Antal (1688–1689) 
 Karolina Anna Dorottya (1689–1759), married Count Karl Ludwig von Roggendorf 
 Ferdinánd II Vilmos Zsigmond, (1690–1694) 
 Lajos I, (1692–1693) 
 Mária Anna Ernesztina Karolina (1693–1761), married Count Joseph Johann Franz Anton Ungnad von Weissenwolf

External links 
ADB (in German)
Austria forum

References 

Hungarian nobility
1657 births
1732 deaths
Field marshals of Austria
Palatines of Hungary
Knights of the Golden Fleece of Austria